Guy Sagiv (born 5 December 1994) is an Israeli cyclist, who rides for UCI ProTeam . In May 2018, he was named in the startlist for the Giro d'Italia.

Personal life
He is in a relationship with Israeli cyclist Omer Shapira.

Major results
Source: 

2015
 1st  Road race, National Road Championships
 1st  Road race, National Under-23 Road Championships
2016
 1st  Road race, National Road Championships
 1st  Road race, National Under-23 Road Championships
2017
 1st  Time trial, National Road Championships
2018
 2nd Road race, National Road Championships
2019
 1st  Road race, National Road Championships
2020
 National Road Championships
1st  Time trial
3rd Road race
2021
 3rd Time trial, National Road Championships
2022
 2nd Road race, National Road Championships

Grand Tour general classification results timeline

References

External links

1994 births
Living people
Israeli male cyclists
Sportspeople from Namur (city)
Cyclists from Namur (province)